The carplets (Amblypharyngodon) are a genus of fishes in the family Cyprinidae.

Species
There are 5 recognized species:

 Amblypharyngodon atkinsonii (Blyth, 1860) (Burmese carplet)
 Amblypharyngodon chulabhornae Vidthayanon & Kottelat, 1990
 Amblypharyngodon melettinus (Valenciennes, 1844) (Attentive carplet)
 Amblypharyngodon microlepis (Bleeker, 1854) (Indian carplet)
 Amblypharyngodon mola (F. Hamilton, 1822) (Mola carplet)

The green carplet is in a separate genus, Horadandia atukorali

References

Amblypharyngodon
Freshwater fish of Asia
Taxa named by Pieter Bleeker